Live in Central Park, NYC is a live album by the band King Crimson, released through the King Crimson Collectors' Club in April 2000.
It was recorded at Central Park, New York, USA, July 1, 1974. This was the last performance by the 1970s incarnation, and the last by King Crimson before reforming in 1981.

Track listing
"No Pussyfooting" (Brian Eno, Robert Fripp) 2:11
"21st Century Schizoid Man" (Fripp, Michael Giles, Greg Lake, Ian McDonald, Peter Sinfield) 7:58
"Lament" (Fripp, Richard Palmer-James, John Wetton) 4:49
"Exiles" (David Cross, Fripp, Palmer-James) 7:53
"Improv: Cerberus" (Bill Bruford, Cross, Fripp, Wetton) 8:27
"Easy Money" (Fripp, Palmer-James, Wetton) 6:26
"Fracture" (Fripp) 11:20
"Starless" (Bruford, Cross, Fripp, Palmer-James, Wetton) 12:31
"The Talking Drum"  (Bruford, Cross, Fripp, Jamie Muir, Wetton) 5:30
"Larks' Tongues in Aspic (Part II)" (Fripp) 6:55

Personnel
Robert Fripp - guitar, mellotron, electric piano
John Wetton - bass guitar, vocals
David Cross - violin, mellotron, electric piano
Bill Bruford - drums, percussion

References

2000 live albums
King Crimson Collector's Club albums
Albums recorded at Central Park